Podgornoye is a rural locality (a selo) and the administrative center of Podgorenskoye Rural Settlement, Rossoshansky District, Voronezh Oblast, Russia. The population was 2,740 as of 2010. There are 19 streets.

Geography 
Podgornoye is located 30 km north of Rossosh (the district's administrative centre) by road. Podgorensky is the nearest rural locality.

References 

Rural localities in Rossoshansky District